The following is a list of Kannada films of the 1970s by year.

Kannada films of 1970
Kannada films of 1971
Kannada films of 1972
Kannada films of 1973
Kannada films of 1974
Kannada films of 1975
Kannada films of 1976
Kannada films of 1977
Kannada films of 1978
Kannada films of 1979

See also
 Kannada cinema

References
 Kannada cinema database by University of Pennsylvania

1970s
Kannada-language
Films, Kannada